Cornus florida, the flowering dogwood, is a species of flowering tree in the family Cornaceae native to eastern North America and northern Mexico. An endemic population once spanned from southernmost coastal Maine south to northern Florida and west to the Mississippi River.  The tree is commonly planted as an ornamental in residential and public areas because of its showy bracts and interesting bark structure.

Classification
The flowering dogwood is usually included in the dogwood genus Cornus as Cornus florida L., although it is sometimes treated in a separate genus as Benthamidia florida (L.) Spach. Less common names for C. florida include American dogwood, Florida dogwood, Indian arrowwood, Cornelian tree, white cornel, white dogwood, false box, and false boxwood.

Two subspecies are generally recognized:

Description

Flowering dogwood attains its greatest size and growth potential in the Upper South, sometimes up to 40 feet in height. At the northern end of its range, heights of 30–33 feet are more typical. Hot, humid summer weather is necessary for new growth to harden off in the fall.

The maximum lifespan of C. florida is about 80 years.

Around 20 flowers are produced in a dense, rounded, umbel-shaped inflorescence, or flower-head,  in diameter.

When in the wild they can typically be found at the forest edge and frequently on dry ridges. While most of the wild trees have white bracts, some selected cultivars of this tree also have pink bracts, some even almost a true red. They typically flower in early April in the southern part of their range, to late April or early May in northern and high altitude areas. The similar Kousa dogwood (Cornus kousa), native to Asia, flowers about a month later.

They are an important food source for dozens of species of birds, which then distribute the seeds. They are also a larval host plant for several moth varieties, including Eudeilinia herminiata, the dogwood thyatirid moth,  Antispila cornifoliella, the stinging rose moth, the grand arches moth, the pecan bark borer,  the dogwood borer, the rosaceaous leaf roller, the diamondback epinotia moth, spring azures, cecropia moths, and the Io moth. While not poisonous to humans, the fruit is extremely sour and unpleasant-tasting. Flowering dogwood is monoecious, meaning the tree has both male and female flowers, and all trees will produce fruit.

Cultivation 
Flowering dogwood does best horticulturally in moist, acidic soil in a site with some afternoon shade, but good morning sun. It does not do well when exposed to intense heat sources such as adjacent parking lots or air conditioning compressors. It also has a low salinity tolerance. The hardiness zone is 5–9 and the preferred pH is between 6.0 and 7.0. In urban and suburban settings, care should be taken not to inflict mower damage on the trunk or roots, as this increases the tree's susceptibility to disease and pest pressure. The common flowering dogwood has been placed on the endangered species list in Ontario. Sites should be selected for reasonably well-drained, fertile soils; full sun is recommended in high-hazard areas (such as stream or pond banks). Dead wood and leaves should be pruned and completely removed and destroyed yearly. Plants should be watered weekly during droughts, with watering done in the morning, avoiding wetting the foliage. Registered fungicides can be applied when necessary, according to manufacturers instructions and advice of local Extension Service.

Flowering dogwood is grown widely throughout the temperate world. 
Selected cultivars

'Amerika Touch-O-Pink' – large bracts, tinged pink; large leaves; good disease resistance.
'Appalachian Spring' – large white bracts; red fall foliage; resistant to dogwood anthracnose.
'Autumn Gold' – white bracts; yellow fall color.
'Barton' – large white bracts; blooms at early age; resistant to stem canker and powdery mildew.
'Bay Beauty' – double white bracts; resists heat and drought; good for Deep South.
'Cherokee Daybreak' – white bract; vigorous grower with variegated leaves.
'Cherokee Chief' – red bracts; red new growth.
'Cherokee Brave' – Even redder than 'Cherokee Chief', smaller bracts but dark red color; consistently resistant to powdery mildew.
'Cherokee Princess' – vigorous white bracts, industry standard for white flowers.
'Cherokee Sunset' – purplish-red bracts; variegated foliage.
'Gulf Coast Pink' – best pink flowering dogwood in Florida – northern part only.
'Hohman's Gold' – white bracts; variegated foliage.
'Jean's Appalachian Snow' – large, overlapping white bracts w/ green flowers; very resistant to powdery mildew.
'Karen's Appalachian Blush' – delicate white bracts edged in pink; some powdery mildew resistance.
'Kay's Appalachian Mist' – stiff, creamy white bracts; red fall foliage; good resistance to powdery mildew.
'Plena' – double white bracts; spot anthracnose-resistant.
'Purple Glory' – red bracts; purple foliage; spot anthracnose-resistant but susceptible to stem canker.
'Weaver White' – large white blooms; large leaves; candelabra shape; good in north-central Florida.

Propagation 

Cornus florida is easily propagated by seeds, which are sown in the fall into prepared rows of sawdust or sand, and emerge in the spring.
Flowering dogwood demonstrates gametophytic self-incompatibility, meaning that the plants can't self-fertilize. This is important for breeding programs as it means that it is not necessary to emasculate (remove the anthers from) C. florida flowers before making controlled cross-pollinations. These pollinations should be repeated every other day, as the flowers must be cross-pollinated within one or two days of opening for pollinations to be effective.

Softwood cuttings taken in late spring or early summer from new growth can be rooted under mist if treated with 8,000 to 10,000 ppm indole-3-butyric acid (IBA). Although rooting success can be as high as 50–85%, this technique is not commonly used by commercial growers. Rather, selected cultivars are generally propagated by T-budding in late summer or by whip grafting in the greenhouse in winter onto seedling rootstock.

Micropropagation of flowering dogwood is now used in breeding programs aiming to incorporate resistance to dogwood anthracnose and powdery mildew into horticulturally and economically important cultivars. Nodal (axillary bud) sections are established in a culture of Woody Plant Medium (WPM) amended with 4.4 μmol/L 6-Benzyladenine (BA) to promote shoot growth.  Rooting of up to 83% can be obtained when 5–7 week-old microshoots are then transferred to WPM amended with 4.9 μmol/L IBA.

Diseases
Dogwood anthracnose caused by the fungi Discula destructiva has caused severe mortality of dogwoods. In regions where dogwood anthracnose is a problem, homeowners and public land managers are encouraged to know the symptoms and inspect trees frequently. The selection of healthy, disease-free planting stock is essential and transplanting trees from the forest should be avoided. Species of Phytophthora cause Root Rot.

Historical uses 
Native Americans used the bark and roots in a remedy for malaria; a red dye was also extracted from the roots.
The species has been used in the production of inks, scarlet dyes, and as a quinine substitute. The hard, dense wood has been used for products such as golf club heads, mallets, wooden rake teeth, tool handles, jeweler's boxes and butcher's blocks. Cornus florida is the state tree and flower of Virginia, the state tree of Missouri, and state flower of North Carolina. It was used to treat dogs with mange, which may be how it got its name. The red berries are not edible, despite some rumors otherwise.

In 1915, 40 dogwood saplings were donated by the U.S. to Japan in the 1912-15 exchange of flowers between Tokyo and Washington, D.C. While the cherry blossom trees survived the ensuing sour relations of these two countries and are the main feature of the National Cherry Blossom Festival, all dogwood trees in Tokyo died except the one that had been planted in an agriculture high school. In 2012, the United States sent 3,000 dogwood saplings to Japan to commemorate the 100th anniversary of the Washington, D.C., cherry trees given as a gift to the U.S. by Japan in 1912.

References

External links 

 Bioimages: Cornus florida
 Flora of Pennsylvania
 Floridata: Cornus florida
 Missouriplants: Cornus florida
 University of Connecticut Plant Database: Cornus florida
 United States Department of Agriculture, National Forest Service: Cornus florida
 University of California @ Davis, Integrated Pest Management Online: Dogwood pest management
 Cornell University, Integrated Pest Management, Dogwood Borer
 United States Department of Agriculture, National Forest Service, St. Paul Field Office, How to Identify and Control Dogwood Anthracnose
 Virginia State University Cooperative Extension, Foliar Diseases of Dogwood
 flowering dogwood - Interactive Native Range Distribution Map of Cornus florida
 

florida
Trees of North America
Hardwood forest plants
Plants described in 1753
Taxa named by Carl Linnaeus
Ornamental trees
Medicinal plants of North America
Symbols of North Carolina
Symbols of Virginia
Cloud forest flora of Mexico